Ericson da Silva (born 11 May 1999), commonly known as Ericson, is a Brazilian professional footballer who plays as a right-back and centre-back for Campeonato Brasileiro Série A club Grêmio.

Club career

Grêmio
Born in Campinas, Brazil, Ericson da Silva joined the Grêmio's Academy at the age of 16 in 2015.

Career statistics

Club

Honours
Grêmio
Copa CONMEBOL Libertadores: 2017
CONMEBOL Recopa Sudamericana: 2018
Campeonato Gaúcho: 2018, 2019, 2020, 2021

References

External links

Profile at the Grêmio F.B.P.A. website

1999 births
Living people
Brazilian footballers
Association football defenders
Campeonato Brasileiro Série A players
Grêmio Foot-Ball Porto Alegrense players
Sportspeople from Campinas